The Dharug National Park is a protected national park that is located in the Central Coast region of New South Wales, in eastern Australia.

The park contains the Great North Road, one of the eleven UNESCO World Heritagelisted Australian Convict Sites. These eleven sites present the story of the forced migration of convicts and the ideas and practices of punishment and reform of criminals during this time.

Location and features

The Dharug National Park lies within the Sydney Basin, a major structural unit of Permian and Triassic age (270-180 million years ago) consisting almost entirely of horizontally bedded sedimentary rocks. The park lies on the northern margin of the Hornsby Plateau; a subdivision of the Sydney Basin.

Fauna 
The park is full of birds and animals that you can meet during the tour. You will be greeted by satin bowerbirds, gang-gang cockatoos and green catbirds.

Etymology
The park derives its name from the indigenous Darug people, who are the traditional custodians of the area.

See also

 Protected areas of New South Wales

References

External links
 
 
 
 
 

National parks of New South Wales
Central Coast (New South Wales)
Protected areas established in 1967
Hawkesbury River
Great Dividing Range
1967 establishments in Australia